St George's School, Ascot is an independent girls' boarding and day school in Ascot, Berkshire, England. It was founded as a boys' school and later became a girls' school.

History
The school was founded in 1877 as a boys' preparatory school. Among its former pupils was the British war-time Prime Minister Winston Churchill. In 1904 it became a finishing school for girls, opened by Miss. Pakenham-Walsh. In 1923 Miss. Anne Loveday took over the school. In 1927 the school was recognised by the Department of Education. In 1932 the swimming pool was built, and in 1943 the sports facilities were extended with tennis courts and games field. From 1939 to 1945 the school functioned during the war and air raid shelters were made to give protection.

Facilities
St George’s, Ascot is located off the High Street in Ascot, Berkshire. The school is close to Windsor Great Park and opposite the Ascot Racecourse.

Boarding
Around half the girls are boarders. They are grouped by years and housed in three dormitories: Markham, Knatchbull and Loveday.

Extracurricular activities

The arts
The majority of students learn musical instruments. The school has a variety of musical groups including: choirs, woodwind. strings, jazz group and orchestra. Many students are involved in school productions and in house productions.

Athletics
All students must participate in the following sports and activities: netball, lacrosse, gymnastics, tennis, swimming, rounders, athletics and squash. Students may choose to participate in football, badminton, volleyball, table tennis, fitness, fencing, ballet, aerobics, modern stage, tap and basketball.

Notable former pupils

Princess Beatrice of York
Lady Davina Lewis, older daughter of Prince Richard, Duke of Gloucester
Lady Rose Gilman, younger daughter of Prince Richard
Vivienne de Watteville
Manpreet Bambra, actress
Elaine Vagliano, Légion d'Honneur, Chevalier; Croix de Guerre avec Palme; Medaille de la Résistance
Rebecca Gethings
Victoria Smurfit
Kimberley Garner, television personality and swimwear designer

Former boys' school;

Sir Winston Churchill, Prime Minister
Niall Campbell, 10th Duke of Argyll
Claud Schuster, 1st Baron Schuster
Harry Graf Kessler

References

External links
School Website
Profile on the ISC website
Profile on MyDaughter

Girls' schools in Berkshire
Boarding schools in Berkshire
Educational institutions established in 1877
Private schools in the Royal Borough of Windsor and Maidenhead
1877 establishments in England
Member schools of the Girls' Schools Association
 
Church of England private schools in the Diocese of Oxford
Sunninghill and Ascot